Bateman is a suburb of Perth, Western Australia, located within the City of Melville.

It is a mostly residential suburb with convenient road access to the Perth central business district, Fremantle, the main industrial sites, and airports.  Bull Creek railway station is located at its north-eastern corner.  In the 2016 census, it was recorded as having a population of 3,717 persons.

History
The suburb is named after a family of prominent merchants who commenced business after arriving in the Swan River colony on board Medina in 1830. John Bateman built a general store in Fremantle and he became postmaster at Fremantle in 1833. He also took part in the establishment of a whaling business at Bathers Beach, Fremantle.  After his death in 1855, his sons took over the family business.

Geography
The suburb is bounded by Leach Highway to the north, Kwinana Freeway to the east, South Street to the south and Murdoch Drive to the west.

Facilities
Bateman is served by Bull Creek railway station (located at the intersection of Leach Highway and the Kwinana Freeway) which was officially opened on 23 December 2007, as part of the Perth to Mandurah railway.

The suburb has a small commercial centre (located on Parry Avenue) along with some medical and chiropractic facilities.

There are two primary schools: Bateman Primary School; Yidarra Catholic Primary School and a private secondary high school, Corpus Christi College.

References

External links

Suburbs of Perth, Western Australia
Suburbs in the City of Melville